The 1944 college football season was the 76th season of intercollegiate football in the United States.  Competition included schools from the Big Ten Conference, the Pacific Coast Conference (PCC), the Southeastern Conference (SEC), the Big Six Conference, the Southern Conference, the Southwestern Conference, and numerous smaller conferences and independent programs.

The season was played at the height of World War II, starting less than three months after the Normandy landings and as battles raged throughout Europe and the Pacific. As in 1943, the Associated Press poll included service teams, drawn from flight schools and training centers which were preparing men for fighting in the war.  Half of the final top 20 teams were composed of service teams, in addition to the Army and Navy service academies.  Many colleges that had suspended their programs in 1943 returned to competition in 1944, including the entire SEC.

The teams ranked highest in the final Associated Press poll in December 1944 were: 

The year's statistical leaders included Bob Fenimore of Oklahoma A&M with 1,758 yards of total offense, Wayne Williams of Minnesota with 911 rushing yards, Paul Rickards of Pittsburgh with 997 passing yards, Reid Moseley of Georgia with 424 receiving yards, and Glenn Davis of Army with 120 points scored.

Season timeline

September
On September 16 the Great Lakes Naval Training Center team defeated Fort Sheridan, 62–0, before a crowd of 25,000 at its base north of Chicago.  Michigan beat Iowa Pre-Flight, 12–7 before a crowd of 22,000 in Ann Arbor.

September 23 Great Lakes won at Purdue, 27–18.  In Milwaukee, Michigan beat Marquette 14–0.  At San Antonio, Randolph Field defeated Abilene Field, 67–0.

September 30  Notre Dame won at Pittsburgh 58–0.  Great Lakes and Illinois played to a 26–26 tie.  Michigan lost to Indiana, 20–0.  In Houston, Randolph Field beat Rice 59–0.  Army beat North Carolina, 46–0.  North Carolina Pre-Flight, quarterbacked by Otto Graham (formerly of Northwestern, and a future Cleveland Browns star) upset Navy, 21–14.

October
October 7 Notre Dame beat Tulane 26–0 and Army defeated Brown 59–7.  In games between service teams and colleges, the servicemen triumphed, as North Carolina Pre-Flight won at Duke, 13–6, Great Lakes won at Northwestern 25–0, and Randolph Field won at Texas 42–6.  In the poll that followed, Notre Dame was first and Army third, with service teams occupying the other spots in the top five: No. 2 North Carolina Pre-Flight, No. 4 Randolph Field, and No. 5 Great Lakes.

October 14 In Boston, No. 1 Notre Dame beat Dartmouth, 64–0.  No. 2 North Carolina Pre-Flight was tied by Virginia, 13–13.  No. 3 Army beat Pittsburgh, 69–7.  No. 4 Randolph Field, quarterbacked by “Bullet Bill” Dudley, beat SMU at home in San Antonio, 41–0.  No. 5 Great Lakes beat Western Michigan 38–0.  No. 8 Ohio State won at No. 19 Wisconsin, 20–7 and No. 11 Iowa Pre-Flight won at No. 7 Purdue, 13–6.  N.C. Pre-Flight and Great Lakes fell out of the top five, which was now No. 1 Notre Dame, No. 2 Army, No. 3 Randolph Field, No. 4 Ohio State, and No. 5 Iowa Pre-Flight.

October 21 No. 1 Notre Dame defeated Wisconsin 28–13.  No. 2 Army beat the Coast Guard Academy, 76–0.  No. 3 Randolph Field and Camp Polk played a Sunday game at Fort Worth, Texas, with Randolph's Ramblers winning 67–0.  No. 4 Ohio State beat No. 6 Great Lakes, 26–6.  No. 5 Iowa Pre-Flight defeated Fort Warren, 30–0.  In Atlanta, No. 8 Georgia Tech defeated No. 9 Navy 17–15 and moved up to No. 5 behind Notre Dame, Army, Randolph Field, and Ohio State.

October 28  No. 1 Notre Dame won at No. 14 Illinois, 13–7.  At a war bonds fundraiser at the Polo Grounds in New York, No. 2 Army beat Duke 27–7.  No. 3 Randolph Field defeated Morris Field 19–0.  No. 4 Ohio State beat Minnesota 34–14.  No. 5 Georgia Tech reached 5–0–0 after a 13–7 win over the flight training school located on the U.Ga. campus, Georgia Pre-Flight. Army moved up to No. 1 in the next poll--the first time since the 1942 season that Notre Dame did not hold the top spot. The Fighting Irish fell to No. 2, followed by No. 3 Ohio State, No. 4 Randolph Field, and No. 5 Georgia Tech.

November
November 4 No. 1 Army rolled over Villanova, 83–0.  In six games, the Cadets had outscored their opponents by an average of 60 to 3.  In Baltimore, No. 2 Notre Dame lost to No. 6 Navy, 32–13.  No. 3 Ohio State beat Indiana 21–7.  No. 4 Randolph Field beat North Texas Agricultural (later called the University of Texas-Arlington) 68–0.  No. 5 Georgia Tech lost at Duke, 19–13. The new top five were No. 1 Army, No. 2 Ohio State, No. 3 Navy, No. 4 Randolph Field, and No. 5 Notre Dame.

November 11 At Yankee Stadium in New York, No. 1 Army crushed No. 5 Notre Dame, 59–0.  No. 2 Ohio State beat Pittsburgh 54–19.  No. 3 Navy beat Cornell, 48–0.  No. 4 Randolph Field defeated Maxwell Field, 25–0.  No. 8 Michigan, which beat No. 10 Illinois 14–0, took Notre Dame's place at No. 5 behind No. 1 Army, No. 2 Randolph Field, No. 3 Navy, and No. 4 Ohio State.

November 18  In Philadelphia, No. 1 Army beat Pennsylvania, 62–7.  In Georgetown, Texas, No. 2 Randolph Field beat Southwestern University, 54–0.  No. 3 Navy defeated No. 14 Purdue in Baltimore, 32–0.  In Cleveland, before a crowd of 83,627 fans, No. 4 Ohio State beat Illinois 26–12.  No. 5 Michigan defeated Wisconsin, 14–0.  In a Sunday game between service teams, No. 6 United States Naval Training Center Bainbridge, Maryland defeated Camp Lejeune, 33–6. The next top five was No. 1 Army, No. 2 Navy, No. 3 Ohio State, No. 4 Randolph Field, and No. 5 Bainbridge Naval.

November 25  No. 1 Army (8–0–0) and No. 2 Navy (6–2–0) were both idle as they prepared for the annual Army–Navy Game.   No. 3 Ohio State beat No. 6 Michigan 18–14.  The next day, No. 4 Randolph Field beat Amarillo Field, 33–0, and No. 5 Bainbridge Naval beat No. 14 Camp Peary, 21–13. The top five remained the same.

December
December 2 No. 1 Army and No. 2 Navy met in Baltimore.  Army's offense was held to its lowest score of the season, but won 23–7 to cap a perfect season.  Army had scored 59 points or more in seven of its nine games, with a 504 to 35 aggregate over its opponents.  No. 3 Ohio State had finished its season and moved up to No. 2 after Navy's loss, while No. 4 Randolph Field and No. 5 Bainbridge Naval were idle.  After the release of the final poll, Randolph Field participated in two more games for the sale of bonds. In Los Angeles, the "Ramblers" beat the Fourth Air Force team (March Field), 20–7, on December 10.  Six days later, Randolph Field met the Second Air Force Superbombers at the Polo Grounds in New York for the “Treasury Bond Bowl”, and won 13–6 to complete their season at 11–0–0. Their final ranking was No. 3, ahead of No. 4 Navy and No. 5 Bainbridge Naval.

Bowl games

Conference standings

Major conference standings

Independents

Minor conferences

Minor conference standings

Rankings

Awards and honors

All-Americans

The consensus All-America team included:

Heisman Trophy voting
The Heisman Trophy is given to the year's most outstanding player

Statistical leaders

Team leaders

Total offense

(*) One game not reported
(**) Two or more games not reported

Total defense

(*) One game not reported
(**) Two or more games not reported

Rushing offense

(*) One game not reported
(**) Two or more games not reported

Rushing defense

(*) One game not reported
(**) Two or more games not reported

Passing offense

(*) One game not reported
(**) Two or more games not reported

Scoring
1. Army - 56.0 points per game
2. Randolph Field - 42.3 points per game
3. Tulsa - 38.0 points per game
4. Washington - 36.6 points per game
5. Second Air Force - 34.2 points per game
6. Ohio State - 31.9 points per game
7. Alabama - 30.2 points per game
9. Great Lakes - 29.0 points per game
10. Iowa Pre-Flight - 28.5 points per game

Individual leaders

Total offense

Rushing

Passing

Receiving

Scoring

References